German submarine U-665 was a Type VIIC U-boat built for Nazi Germany's Kriegsmarine for service during World War II.
She was laid down on 10 June 1941 by Deutsche Werft, Hamburg as yard number 814, launched on 9 June 1942 and commissioned on 22 July 1942 under Leutnant zur See Hans-Jürgen Haupt.

Design
German Type VIIC submarines were preceded by the shorter Type VIIB submarines. U-665 had a displacement of  when at the surface and  while submerged. She had two shafts and two  propellers.

U-665 was fitted with five  torpedo tubes (four fitted at the bow and one at the stern), fourteen torpedoes, one  SK C/35 naval gun, 220 rounds, and two twin  C/30 anti-aircraft guns. The boat had a complement of between forty-four and sixty.

Service history
The boat's career began with training at 5th U-boat Flotilla on 22 July 1942, followed by active service on 1 February 1943 as part of the 1st Flotilla for the remainder of her short service.

Wolfpacks
U-665 took part in three wolfpacks, namely:
 Neuland (4 – 6 March 1943)
 Ostmark (6 – 11 March 1943)
 Stürmer (11 – 20 March 1943)

Fate
U-665 has been missing since 22 March 1943 in the Bay of Biscay, west of La Pallice.

Previously recorded fate
This attack was actually against U-448, inflicting no damage.

Summary of raiding history

References

Bibliography

External links

German Type VIIC submarines
1942 ships
U-boats commissioned in 1942
Ships lost with all hands
U-boats sunk in 1943
U-boats sunk by depth charges
U-boats sunk by British aircraft
Missing U-boats of World War II
World War II shipwrecks in the Atlantic Ocean
World War II submarines of Germany
Ships built in Hamburg
Maritime incidents in March 1943